Dzilam González Municipality (In the Yucatec Maya Language: "peeling" combined with the Spanish surname "González") is one of the 106 municipalities in the Mexican state of Yucatán containing  of land and located roughly  northeast of the city of Mérida. It was once the port of Dzilam which has now receded inland is known as Dzilam González. The agricultural produces of the area are corn, onions, beans and fruit.

History
During pre-Hispanic times, the town fell within the provinces under the chieftainship of Cheles. After the conquest the area became part of the encomienda system. In 1544 Francisco de Montejo established a town at the site.

Yucatán declared its independence from the Spanish Crown in 1821 and in 1825, the area was assigned to the Coastal region with its headquarters in Izamal. In 1825, "González" was appended to the name to differentiate this place from a port with the same name. In 1900 it was separated to form its own municipality, which included the area that is now Dzilam de Bravo Municipality until 1921, when that was separated.

Some years back there were extensive ruins here but now there are two Mayan ruins.

Governance
The municipal president is elected for a three-year term. The town council has seven councilpersons, who serve as Secretary and councilors of sports, public services, heritage, public security, cemeteries and public works.

The Municipal Council administers the business of the municipality. It is responsible for budgeting and expenditures and producing all required reports for all branches of the municipal administration. Annually it determines educational standards for schools.

The Police Commissioners ensure public order and safety. They are tasked with enforcing regulations, distributing materials and administering rulings of general compliance issued by the council.

Communities
The head of the municipality is Dzilam González, Yucatán. There are 72 populated locations in the municipality. The larger populated areas include Hacienda Escalante, Eugenio Zapata and San Román. The significant populations are shown below:

Local festivals
Every year from the 10 to 13 June they celebrate the festival in honor of San Antonio de Padua, patron saint of the town.

Tourist attractions
Cenote Ayim
Cenote Chen Cimen
Cenote Labom

References

Bibliography

Municipalities of Yucatán